Grano may refer to:

Places
Granö, Sweden 
Grano, North Dakota, U.S.

People
Antonino Grano (1660–1718), Italian painter and engraver
Carlo Grano (1887–1976), Italian Cardinal of the Roman Catholic Church
Giorgio Gandini del Grano (died 1538), Italian painter 
John Baptist Grano ( 1692– 1748), English trumpeter, flutist, and composer
Joseph J. Grano Jr. (born 1948), American business executive
Megan Grano (born 1977/1978), American actor and writer
Paul Grano (1894–1975), Australian poet and journalist
Tony Grano (born 1980), American heavyweight boxer

Other uses
Grano, a subdivision of the currency Maltese scudo

See also